Little Dorrit (Danish: Lille Dorrit) is a 1924 Danish silent historical drama film directed by A.W. Sandberg and starring Frederik Jensen, Karina Bell and Karen Winther. It is based on the 1857 Charles Dickens' novel of the same name.

The film's art direction was by Carlo Jacobsen.

Cast
 Frederik Jensen as William Dorrit  
 Karina Bell as Amy, genannt Klein Dorrit, sein Kind 
 Karen Winther as Fanny, ihre Schwester  
 Knud Schrøder as Tip, ihr Bruder  
 Georg Busch as Frederik Dorrit  
 Gunnar Tolnæs as Arthur Clennam  
 Ingeborg Pehrson as Mrs. Clennam, seine Mutter  
 Carl Hinz as Jeremias Flintwich & Efraim Flintwich  
 Mathilde Nielsen as Afferty, Efraims Frau  
 Torben Meyer as Hauptschließer Chivery  
 Kate Fabian as Seine Frau  
 Erik Skold Petersen as John  
 Karen Caspersen as Maggy  
 Peter Nielsen as Rigaud  
 Kai Paaske as Pancks

References

Bibliography
 Glavin, John. Dickens on Screen. Cambridge University Press, 2003.

External links
 

1924 films
1920s historical drama films
1920s Danish-language films
Danish silent films
Danish historical drama films
Films based on Little Dorrit
Films directed by A. W. Sandberg
Films set in England
Films set in the 19th century
Danish black-and-white films
1924 drama films
Silent historical drama films